York-Chester Historic District is a national historic district located at Gastonia, Gaston County, North Carolina.  It encompasses 649 contributing buildings, 2 contributing sites, and 1 contributing structure in a predominantly residential section of Gastonia. The dwellings were built between about 1856 and 1955, and include notable examples of Queen Anne and Bungalow / American Craftsman architecture. Located in the district are the separately listed former Gastonia High School.  Other notable contributing resources include the Beal-Ragan Garden, Oakwood Cemetery, Caroline Hanna House (c. 1882), Spurrier Apartment building (c. 1929), Edgewood Apartments (c. 1937), and Devant J. and June S. Purvis House (1951).

It was listed on the National Register of Historic Places in 2005.

References

Historic districts on the National Register of Historic Places in North Carolina
Queen Anne architecture in North Carolina
Buildings and structures in Gaston County, North Carolina
National Register of Historic Places in Gaston County, North Carolina